Lola Cornero (30 March 1892 – 6 May 1980) was a Dutch film actress of the silent era. She appeared in 17 films between 1916 and 1920.

Filmography
 John Heriot's Wife (1920)
 As God Made Her (1920)
 Het verborgen leven (1920)
 Zonnetje (1919)
 Amerikaansche meisjes (1918)
 Oorlog en vrede - 1918 (1918)
 Oorlog en vrede - 1916 (1918)
 Oorlog en vrede - 1914 (1918)
 Toen 't licht verdween (1918)
 De kroon der schande (1918)
 Ulbo Garvema (1917)
 Gouden ketenen (1917)
 Madame Pinkette & Co (1917)
 La renzoni (1916)
 Majoor Frans (1916)
 Liefdesoffer (1916)
 Vogelvrij (1916)

External links

1892 births
1980 deaths
Dutch film actresses
Dutch silent film actresses
Actors from Kiel
20th-century Dutch actresses